Material Defectuoso is the tenth studio album by Spanish hard rock band Extremoduro. It was produced by Iñaki "Uoho" Antón, and released on 24 May 2011. The first single "Tango Suicida" was released on 17 May 2011.

Track listing

Personnel 
Extremoduro
 Roberto "Robe" Iniesta – vocals, guitars, chorus on #01, 03, 06
 Iñaki "Uoho" Antón – guitars, chorus, bass on #03, 04; organ on #01, 04, 05, 06; trombon on #03; piano on #04
 Miguel Colino – bass on #01, 02, 05, 06; vocals on #05
 José Ignacio Cantera – drums; vocals on #05
Additional musicians
 María "Cebolleta" Martín – chorus
 Gino Pavone – percussion on #01, 02, 04, 05, 06
 Javier Mora – clavinet on #01; organ on #03, 05; piano on #05
 Mikel Piris – saxophone on #03, 05; flutes on #06
 Ara Malikian – violin on #04, 06
 Mario Pérez – violin on #04, 06
 Humberto Armas – viola on #04, 06
 Juan Pérez de Albéniz – contrabass on #04, 06

Charts

Weekly charts

Year-end charts

Certifications

Reception

Material defectuoso has received generally positive reviews. Rolling Stone Spain claimed that the album was excellent and innovative. However, Allmusic complained that it was good but too relaxed.

Notes

External links 
 Extremoduro official website (in Spanish)

2011 albums
Extremoduro albums
Spanish-language albums